Route 390 is a provincial highway located in the Abitibi-Témiscamingue region in southwestern Quebec, Canada. The  highway runs from Palmarolle at the junction of Route 393 and ends in Taschereau at the junction of Route 111. It also intersects with Route 101 in Poularies.

Towns along Route 390

 Palmarolle
 Poularies
 Taschereau
 Taschereau-Village

See also

 List of Quebec provincial highways

References

External links 
 Official Transports Quebec Map 
 Route 390 on Google Maps

390